This is a list of the described species of the harvestman family Biantidae. The data is taken from Joel Hallan's Biology Catalog.

Biantinae
Biantinae Thorell, 1889

 Anaceros Lawrence, 1959 — Madagascar
 Anaceros anodonta Lawrence, 1959
 Anaceros canidens Lawrence, 1959
 Anaceros humilis Lawrence, 1959
 Anaceros pauliani Lawrence, 1959

 Biantella Roewer, 1927
 Biantella reticulata Roewer, 1927 — Cameroon

 Biantes Simon, 1885
 Biantes albimanum (Loman, 1902) — Seychelles
 Biantes aelleni Silhavy, 1973
 Biantes annapurnae J. Martens, 1978 — Nepal
 Biantes atroluteus Roewer, 1914 — India
 Biantes brevis J. Martens, 1978 — Nepal
 Biantes carli Roewer, 1929 — India
 Biantes conspersus Roewer, 1927 — Bombay
 Biantes dilatatus J. Martens, 1978 — Nepal
 Biantes fuscipes Thorell, 1890 — Pinang
 Biantes gandaki J. Martens, 1978 — Nepal
 Biantes gandakoides J. Martens, 1978 — Nepal
 Biantes ganesh J. Martens, 1978 — Nepal
 Biantes godavari J. Martens, 1978 — Nepal
 Biantes gurung J. Martens, 1978 — Nepal
 Biantes jirel J. Martens, 1978 — Nepal
 Biantes kathmandicus J. Martens, 1978 — Nepal
 Biantes lecithodes Thorell, 1899 — Burma
 Biantes longimanus Simon, 1885 — India
 Biantes magar J. Martens, 1978 — Nepal
 Biantes minimus M. Rambla, 1983 — Seychelles
 Biantes newar J. Martens, 1978 — Nepal
 Biantes parvulus (Herbst, 1911) — Seychelles
 Biantes pernepalicus J. Martens, 1978 — Nepal
 Biantes quadrituberculatus Roewer, 1929 — India
 Biantes rarensis J. Martens, 1978 — Nepal
 Biantes sherpa J. Martens, 1978 — Nepal
 Biantes simplex J. Martens, 1978 — Nepal
 Biantes thakkhali J. Martens, 1978 — Nepal
 Biantes thamang J. Martens, 1978 — Nepal
 Biantes vitellinus Thorell, 1890 — Sumatra

 Biantessus Roewer, 1949
 Biantessus vertebralis (Lawrence, 1933) — South Africa
 Biantessus nigrotarsus (Lawrence, 1933) — South Africa

 Biantomma Roewer, 1942
 Biantomma nigrospinosum Roewer, 1942 — Bioko

 Clinobiantes Roewer, 1927
 Clinobiantes paradoxus Roewer, 1927 — Cameroon

 Cryptobiantes Kauri, 1962
 Cryptobiantes protector Kauri, 1961

 Eubiantes Roewer, 1915
 Eubiantes africanus Roewer, 1915 — eastern Africa

 Fageibiantes Roewer, 1949
 Fageibiantes bicornis (Fage, 1946) — Madagascar
 Fageibiantes bispina (Lawrence, 1959)

 Hinzuanius Karsch, 1880
 Hinzuanius africanus Pavesi, 1883 — Ethiopia
 Hinzuanius comorensis (Roewer, 1949) — Comoros
 Hinzuanius flaviventris (Pocock, 1903) — Socotra
 Hinzuanius gracilis (Roewer, 1949) — Madagascar
 Hinzuanius indicus (Roewer, 1915)
 Hinzuanius insulanus Karsch, 1880 — Comoros
 Hinzuanius littoralis (Lawrence, 1959)
 Hinzuanius madagassis (Roewer, 1949) — Madagascar
 Hinzuanius mauriticus Roewer, 1927
 Hinzuanius milloti (Fage, 1946) — Madagascar
 Hinzuanius pardalis (Lawrence, 1959)
 Hinzuanius pauliani (Lawrence, 1959)
 Hinzuanius tenebrosus (Lawrence, 1959)
 Hinzuanius vittatus (Simon, 1885) — Madagascar

 Ivobiantes Lawrence, 1965
 Ivobiantes spinipalpis Lawrence, 1965

 Metabiantes Roewer, 1915
 Metabiantes armatus Lawrence, 1962
 Metabiantes barbertonensis Lawrence, 1963
 Metabiantes basutoanus Kauri, 1961
 Metabiantes cataracticus Kauri, 1961
 Metabiantes convexus Roewer, 1949 — Rewenzori, East Africa
 Metabiantes filipes (Roewer, 1912) — Cameroon
 Metabiantes flavus Lawrence, 1949 — Angola
 Metabiantes hanstroemi Kauri, 1961
 Metabiantes incertus Kauri, 1961
 Metabiantes insulanus (Roewer, 1949) — Principe
 Metabiantes jeanneli (Roewer, 1913) — Kenya
 Metabiantes kakololius H. Kauri, 1985 — Zaire
 Metabiantes kosibaiensis Kauri, 1961
 Metabiantes lawrencei Starega, 1992
 Metabiantes leighi (Pocock, 1902) — Natal
 Metabiantes litoralis Kauri, 1961
 Metabiantes longipes H. Kauri, 1985 — Zaire
 Metabiantes machadoi Lawrence, 1957
 Metabiantes maximus Lawrence, 1931 — South Africa
 Metabiantes meraculus (Loman, 1898) — South Africa
 Metabiantes minutus H. Kauri, 1985 — Zaire
 Metabiantes montanus H. Kauri, 1985 — Zaire
 Metabiantes obscurus Kauri, 1961
 Metabiantes parvulus H. Kauri, 1985 — Zaire
 Metabiantes perustus Lawrence, 1963
 Metabiantes pumilio Roewer, 1927
 Metabiantes punctatus (Sørensen, 1910) — eastern Africa
 Metabiantes pusulosus (Loman, 1898) — Natal
 Metabiantes rudebecki Kauri, 1961
 Metabiantes stanleyi H. Kauri, 1985 — Zaire
 Metabiantes submontanus H. Kauri, 1985 — Zaire
 Metabiantes teres Lawrence, 1963
 Metabiantes teretipes Lawrence, 1962
 Metabiantes traegardhi Kauri, 1961
 Metabiantes trifasciatus Roewer, 1915 — eastern Africa
 Metabiantes ulindinus H. Kauri, 1985 — Zaire
 Metabiantes unicolor (Roewer, 1912) — Kenya
 Metabiantes urbanus Kauri, 1961
 Metabiantes varius Kauri, 1961
 Metabiantes zuluanus Lawrence, 1937 — Natal
 Metabiantes zuurbergianus Kauri, 1961

 Monobiantes Lawrence, 1962
 Monobiantes benoiti Lawrence, 1962

 Probiantes Roewer, 1927
 Probiantes croceus Roewer, 1927 — Bombay

Lacurbsinae
Lacurbsinae Lawrence, 1959

 Eulacurbs Roewer, 1949
 Eulacurbs paradoxa Roewer, 1949 — Ghana

 Heterolacurbs Roewer, 1912
 Heterolacurbs ovalis Roewer, 1912 — Togo

 Lacurbs Sørensen, 1896
 Lacurbs spinosa Sørensen, 1896 — Cameroon
 Lacurbs nigrimana Roewer, 1912 — Ivory Coast

 Metalacurbs Roewer, 1914
 Metalacurbs cornipes (Roewer, 1958)
 Metalacurbs oedipus (Roewer, 1958)
 Metalacurbs simoni Roewer, 1914 — western Africa
 Metalacurbs villiersi (Roewer, 1953)

 Prolacurbs Roewer, 1949
 Prolacurbs singularis Roewer, 1949 — Ghana

Stenostygninae
Stenostygninae Roewer, 1913

 Bidoma Silhavy, 1973
 Bidoma indivisa Silhavy, 1973 — Haiti

 Caribbiantes Silhavy, 1973
 Caribbiantes cubanus Silhavy, 1973 — Cuba

 Decuella Avram, 1977
 Decuella cubaorientalis Avram, 1977 — Cuba

 Galibrotus Silhavy, 1973
 Galibrotus carlotanus Silhavy, 1973 — Cuba
 Galibrotus matiasis Avram, 1977 — Cuba
 Galibrotus riedeli Silhavy, 1973 — Cuba

 Manahunca Silhavy, 1973
 Manahunca bielawskii Silhavy, 1973 — Cuba
 Manahunca cuevajibarae Avram, 1977 — Cuba
 Manahunca silhavyi Avram, 1977 — Cuba

 Martibianta Silhavy, 1973
 Martibianta virginsulana Silhavy, 1973 — Virgin Islands

 Negreaella Avram, 1977
 Negreaella fundorai Avram, 1977 — Cuba
 Negreaella palenquensis Avram, 1977 — Cuba
 Negreaella rioindiocubanicola Avram, 1977 — Cuba
 Negreaella vinai Avram, 1977 — Cuba
 Negreaella yumuriensis Avram, 1977 — Cuba

 Stenostygnus Simon, 1879
 Stenostygnus pusio Simon, 1879 — Brazil, French Guiana (Cayenne), Colombia, Ecuador

 Vestitecola Silhavy, 1973
 Vestitecola haitensis Silhavy, 1973 — Haiti

Zairebiantinae
Zairebiantinae Kauri, 1985

 Zairebiantes H. Kauri, 1985
 Zairebiantes microphthalmus H. Kauri, 1985 — Zaire

References
 Joel Hallan's Biology Catalog: Biantidae

Biantidae
Biantidae